The Skidi or Skiri, also known as the Wolf Pawnee or the French Loup Pawnee, are a band of Pawnee people. According to tradition in earlier times, the Skidi were associated with the Arikara before the Arikara moved northward. The Skidi language was less related to the other Pawnee languages than the other three tribes' languages were related to each other. In historic times, the Skidi first lived on the Loup River in Nebraska.

The Skidi's main habitations were along the Platte River. Some early explorers referred to this waterway as the Panimaha River, since this was before some of the Skidi migrated south; that name came to be associated with a different group.
By the 1770s, a group of the Skidi had broken off and moved towards Texas, where they allied with the Taovayas, the Tonkawa, Yojuanes and other Texas tribes. This group was referred to as the Panimaha.
The Skidi are notable for their performance of a type of human sacrifice, known as the Morning Star ceremony, recorded for the last time in 1838.

Today, the Skidi Pawnee are enrolled in the Pawnee Nation of Oklahoma.

References

Handbook of North American Indians: Plains, Part 1 page 545

External links
Access Genealogy Pawnee Tribe history

Pawnee
Native American tribes in Nebraska
Native American tribes in Oklahoma